Mark Devlin may refer to:

 Mark D. Devlin (1948–2005), author
 Mark Devlin (American football) (1894–1973), professional American football player
 Mark Devlin (footballer) (born 1973), footballer who played in The Football League for Exeter City and Stoke City